Pernes-les-Fontaines (officially Pernes until 1936; Occitan: Pèrnas dei Fònts or simply Pèrnas) is a commune in the southeastern French department of Vaucluse. In 2019, it had a population of 10,170. Its inhabitants are called Pernois and Pernoises.

Population

People related to Pernes-les-Fontaines
 Esprit Fléchier (1632–1710)
 Esprit Antoine Blanchard (1696–1770)
 Charles Giraud (1802–1885)
 Paul de Vivie (1853–1930)
 Daniel Sorano (1920–1962)
 Ahmad Jamal (born 1930)
 Jean Ragnotti (born 1945)
 Richard Descoings (1958–2012)

See also
Communes of the Vaucluse department

References

Communes of Vaucluse